Raymond Teret (24 October 1941 – 5 May 2021) was an English radio disc jockey who started his career in the 1960s. In December 2014 he was convicted of rape and indecent assault, and was sentenced to 25 years in prison. He died in prison in May 2021 at the age of 79, having served just over six years behind bars.

Early life and career
Teret was born in Salisbury, Wiltshire, and began work as a warehouse clerk, apprentice heating engineer and waiter at the Ritz Ballroom in Manchester. In the early 1960s, Teret met Jimmy Savile after winning the Savile-run singing contest at the Palace Theatre in Manchester. The two men later shared a flat on Great Clowes Street in Broughton, Salford, with Teret becoming Savile's support DJ, assistant and chauffeur.

Teret joined Radio Caroline North in the mid-1960s, where he became known as "Ugli" Ray Teret. His theme music was "Jungle Fever" by the Tornados, and he also used "The Ugly Bug Ball" by Burl Ives. After leaving Radio Caroline North in 1966, two years before it closed down, Teret worked in a series of DJ- and media-related work, mainly on Piccadilly Radio in Manchester and Signal Radio in Stoke-on-Trent.

Sexual assaults
In 1999, when he was 58 years old, Teret was found guilty of unlawful sex with a 15-year-old girl.

On 8 November 2012, Teret was arrested at his home on Woodlands Road in Altrincham by Greater Manchester Police, one of two arrests made in connection with an allegation of historic rape. The offences are alleged to have taken place in Trafford in the 1960s and 1970s against three women who were then children. The arrests were not part of Operation Yewtree (the investigation into offences allegedly committed by Jimmy Savile and others) though Teret had been a close associate of Savile.

In October 2014, Teret appeared at Minshull Street Crown Court accused of more than 30 offences of sexual abuse, including 18 charges of rape, some dating back to the 1960s. One of the charges related to an alleged offence committed by Teret and Savile together. Two other men, William Harper and Alan Ledger, were also charged, and were tried alongside Teret. All three men denied all the charges. In December Teret was found guilty of seven charges of rape and eleven charges of indecent assault, with one victim aged only 12. The other two defendants were found not guilty of all charges, and Teret was acquitted of assisting Savile to rape an alleged victim, but was found guilty of raping the same complainant himself.

On 11 December 2014, Mr Justice Baker sentenced Teret to 25 years in prison. The judge said that it was likely that most, if not all, of his remaining years would be spent in prison, and that had Teret been convicted nearer the time of the offences, a life sentence would have been appropriate. A lawyer for 169 of Savile's victims stated that Teret's conviction represents "the closest the victims of Jimmy Savile will get to a conviction against their attacker".

On 17 May 2015, a television programme detailing the investigation into the claims of historic sexual abuse against Teret was broadcast on BBC Two. The Detectives depicted investigators discovering extensive graffiti dating to the 1960s and '70s behind the wallpaper in Teret's former apartment. The names, telephone numbers and other data in the graffiti both confirmed the testimony of victims and contradicted Teret's testimony that he did not know the victims.

Death
Teret died in prison in Manchester on 5 May 2021.

References

1941 births
2021 deaths
20th-century English criminals
English people convicted of indecent assault
Chauffeurs
Criminals from Wiltshire
English people convicted of rape
English people convicted of child sexual abuse
English people who died in prison custody
English radio DJs
Jimmy Savile
Offshore radio broadcasters
People from Salisbury
Pirate radio personalities
Prisoners who died in England and Wales detention